Spicy City is an adult animated erotic cyberpunk television series which was created by Ralph Bakshi for HBO. It is an anthology series in a similar format as television programs such as  The Twilight Zone and Tales from the Crypt. The series premiered on July 11, 1997 and ended on August 22, with a total of 6 episodes over the course of 1 season.

Premise
The plot was described as a science fiction anthology series set in a futuristic city with a steamy side. Each episode is introduced by Raven, a nightclub hostess who also makes brief appearances in the tales.

Production

Discussions involving a series based upon Trey Parker and Matt Stone's video Christmas card Jesus vs. Santa (which would become South Park) led HBO to contact Ralph Bakshi in order to produce the first animated series targeted specifically toward adults. Bakshi enlisted a team of writers, including his son Preston, to develop Spicy Detective, later renamed Spicy City.

Cast
Michelle Phillips as Raven
James Keane (credited as James Kean) as Lem
Barry Stigler as Boxer
Mary Mara as Alice Kerchief/Geisha
John Hostetter as Jake
Vince Melocchi as Shark
Alex Fernandez as Armando "Mano" Mantio
Cecilia Noel as Red Beans
James Hanes as Big Vinnie
Ralph Bakshi as Stevie/Connelly/Goldblum
Pamala Tyson as Bruja/Ebony and Venus Sartori
Tuesday Knight as Prostitute/Virus
James Keane as Flaxson
Darrell Kunitomi as Loh
Grace Zandarski as Driver
James Asher as Harry
Tasia Valenza as Margo
Tony Amendola as Skankmeyer
Julie DeMita as Frenchy
Rick Naiera as Vic Guapo
Lewis Arquette as Farfelson/Corbin
Jennifer Darling as Elvira
E.G. Daily as Nisa Lolita
Joey Camen as Max
Michael Yama as Otaku 
Brock Peters as Bird
Charlie Adler as Additional Voices
Dan Castellaneta as Additional Voices
Tress MacNeille as Additional Voices
Matt K. Miller as Additional Voices
Andy Philpot as Additional Voices
Marnie Mosiman as Additional Voices
Brendan O'Brien as Additional Voices
David Fennoy as Additional Voices
Danny Mann as Additional Voices

Episodes

Reception 
The series premiered on 11 July 1997, beating South Park to television by over a month and becoming the first "adults only" cartoon series.

Although critical reaction was mixed and largely unfavorable, Spicy City received acceptable ratings.  The Los Angeles Times called the series "Adolescent Humor for Adults" The Dallas Morning News said the series "exploits the female form".

A second season was approved, but the network wanted to fire Bakshi's writing team and hire professional Los Angeles screenwriters. When Bakshi refused to cooperate with the network, the series was cancelled.

References

External links

1990s American science fiction television series
1990s American adult animated television series
1997 American television series debuts
1997 American television series endings
American adult animation anthology series
American adult animated mystery television series
American adult animated science fiction television series
English-language television shows
HBO original programming
Cyberpunk television series
Television series by Warner Bros. Television Studios
Television series created by Ralph Bakshi